David Edelstein (born 1959) is a freelance American film critic who has been the principal film critic for Slate and New York magazine, among others, and has appeared regularly on NPR's Fresh Air and CBS Sunday Morning programs. Over a long career, Edelstein has published more than 2000 film reviews. In 2021, Colin McEnroe called Edelstein "America's greatest living film critic".

Career 
Edelstein became a journalist after graduating from Harvard University in 1981. He is often associated with close friend, fellow film critic, and iconoclast Pauline Kael. He is also credited with coining the term "torture porn," a genre to describe such movies as Hostel and Saw.

He has previously been a film critic for Slate (1996–2005), NPR's Fresh Air (2002-2018), New York (2006-2020), the New York Post, The Village Voice, and The Boston Phoenix. His work has also appeared in The New York Times Arts & Leisure section, Rolling Stone, Vanity Fair, The New York Times Magazine, Variety, and Esquire, among others. He has been a member of the New York Film Critics Circle and the National Society of Film Critics. Edelstein appeared six times as a guest on the television program Charlie Rose to talk about the movies and the Oscar telecast.

Dismissal from Fresh Air
On November 26, 2018, Edelstein came under controversy when he made a joke about a sex scene in Bertolucci's 1972 film Last Tango in Paris on his Facebook page. The joke was part of his post noting the passing of the film's director Bernardo Bertolucci. Edelstein’s post was widely criticized, and Edelstein promptly apologized and deleted the original post. He said he had been unaware of actress Maria Schneider's statement in 2007 that she wasn’t told about the simulated sex scene until right before filming and that it caused her trauma. The following day, Fresh Air characterized the post as "offensive and unacceptable", and announced that Edelstein had been dismissed as a contributor. The statement reads, "The post does not meet the standards that we expect from Fresh Air contributors...We have decided to end Fresh Air’s association with him, and have informed David accordingly.” The harshness of the media response to Edelstein's post and apology, and of his firing by Fresh Air, was criticized by several media outlets, including Salon, the editorial board of the New York Post, and The American Conservative.

Bibliography 
He is the co-author with independent film producer Christine Vachon of the book Shooting to Kill (1998). He is also the author of two plays, Feed the Monkey (Loeb Experimental Theater, Harvard College, 1993) and Blaming Mom (Watermark Theater, New York City, 1994).

References

Further reading

External links
  Short biography and list of reviews.
 Edelstein's Top 10 films of 2016,  2015, 2014, 2013, 2012, 2011, 2010,2009, 2008, 2007, 2006, 2005, 2004,  2003, 2002, 2001, 2000, 1999, and 1998.

Archive of pieces by David Edelstein at New York Magazine 
 Video discussion/interview

1959 births
20th-century American male writers
20th-century American non-fiction writers
21st-century American male writers
21st-century American non-fiction writers
American film critics
National Society of Film Critics Members
American film historians
American male non-fiction writers
CBS News people
Film theorists
Loomis Chaffee School alumni
Harvard College alumni
Jewish American writers
Living people
New York (magazine) people
NPR personalities
Slate (magazine) people